The Dassault Mirage G was a French two-seat twinjet variable-geometry prototype fighter, built by Dassault Aviation in the late 1960s. The type was further developed into the twin-engine Mirage G4 and G8 variants as a multi-role jet fighter capable of both interception and nuclear strike missions. Although Dassault built and flew prototypes, the entire programme was terminated in the 1970s without the aircraft entering production.

Development
In 1964 the French defence ministry requested a development programme on variable-sweep wing aircraft for dual land and aircraft carrier use. France had participated with the Anglo-French Variable Geometry aircraft (AFVG) before abandoning their interest; later Dassault received an order for a prototype, powered by a single Pratt & Whitney/SNECMA TF-306 turbofan in October 1965.

The first variable-sweep aircraft from Dassault emerged as the single-engined, two-seat Mirage G fighter in 1967, essentially a swing wing version of the Mirage F2. The wings were swept at 22 degrees when fully forward and 70 degrees when fully aft and featured full-span double-slotted trailing edge flaps and two-position leading edge flaps.

Flight trials were relatively successful but no production order ensued, the Mirage G programme being cancelled in 1968. Flying with the Mirage G continued however until 13 January 1971 when the sole prototype was lost in an accident.

Variants

Mirage G
Single-engined initial version, first flight 18 November 1967. Crashed 13 January 1971.

Mirage G4

The basic Mirage G was developed into a twin-engine, two-seat nuclear strike fighter, the Mirage G4 after a separate contract was issued in 1968 for two aircraft to be built. These aircraft were intended to be powered by Snecma M53 turbofans in production. While the aircraft were under construction the requirements changed and the French military requested that the design be converted into a dedicated interceptor, the Mirage G8.

Mirage G8
Mirage G4-01 was redesignated G8-01 and remained a two-seat aircraft (first flight 8 May 1971) with the second aircraft, G4-02 becoming a single-seat version, G8-02 (first flight 13 July 1972). The G8 variants were equipped with Thomson-CSF radar and a low-altitude navigational-attack system based on that used in the SEPECAT Jaguar and Dassault Milan. As no funding was included for the Mirage G8 in the 1971-1976 French defence budget the aircraft did not enter production.

Cooperation on LTV V-507

In the late 1960s, the US manufacturer Ling-Temco-Vought (LTV) was seeking technical data on variable-geometry wings, within the framework of a bid for the US Navy's VFX carrier fighter contract. As a result of the publicity gained by the Mirage G, LTV sought the assistance of Dassault, as well as General Dynamics, which had secured a contract with the USAF for a variable geometry fighter-bomber/attack aircraft, the F-111A. Two agreements were signed by Dassault and LTV in 1968: one for general cooperation and the other specifically in regard to variable-geometry wings. This resulted in two LTV designs, the Vought V-505 and V-507, as well as construction of a full-scale, non-flying mockup of the second design. There were two competing bids, both with variable geometry: the McDonnell F-4(FVS), which was a variant of the Phantom II, and the Grumman 303. The latter was successful and was developed into the F-14. However, during its development, Grumman approached LTV for details of the V-507, including some of the same technical solutions devised for the Mirage G.

Some of the same data also contributed to the Vought Model V-1100, which competed for the Pentagon's Light Weight Fighter program in the 1970s. However, this LTV design did not include variable geometry (and was more closely related to the LTV A-7 Corsair II). This particular proposal was also rejected and the F-16 and F/A-18 were eventually selected for production.

Aircraft on display
 Dassault Mirage G8-01 is on public display at the Musée de l’air et de l’espace near Paris.
 Dassault Mirage G8-02 is on public display at the Musée Européen de l'Aviation de Chasse,  Montélimar.

Specifications (Mirage G8-02)

See also

References

Notes

Bibliography
 Buttler, Tony. X-Planes of Europe II: Military Prototype Aircraft from the Golden Age 1946–1974. Manchester, UK: Hikoki Publications, 2015. 
Buttler, Tony and Jean-Louis Delezenne. X-Planes of Europe: Secret Research Aircraft from the Golden Age 1946-1974. Manchester, UK: Hikoki Publications, 2012. 
Carbonel, Jean-Christophe. French Secret Projects 1: Post War Fighters. Manchester, UK: Crecy Publishing, 2016 
 Green, William. The Observer's Book of Aircraft. London. Frederick Warne & Co. Ltd., 1968.
 Green, William. The Observer's Book of Aircraft. London. Frederick Warne & Co. Ltd., 1972.

External links

 Flight International - October 1971 - Mirage G

Mirage G
1960s French attack aircraft
1960s French fighter aircraft
Twinjets
Variable-sweep-wing aircraft
Cancelled military aircraft projects of France
Aircraft first flown in 1967